I Was Warned is a blues album by Robert Cray. It was released in April 1992 through Mercury Records. Like Cray’s previous album, it features his regular backing band playing alongside The Memphis Horns.

Track listing 
 "Just a Loser" (Tim Kaihatsu) – 4:23
 "I'm a Good Man" (Cray, Dennis Walker) – 4:12
 "I Was Warned" (Cray, Dennis Walker) – 7:15
 "The Price I Pay" (Cray, Dennis Walker) – 5:06
 "Won the Battle" (Jim Pugh, Dennis Walker) – 3:53
 "On the Road Down" (Cray, Steve Cropper) – 4:02
 "A Whole Lotta Pride" (Cray, Dennis Walker) – 4:34
 "A Picture of a Broken Heart" (Boz Scaggs, Dennis Walker) – 5:22
 "He Don't Live Here Anymore" (Jim Pugh, Dennis Walker) – 5:13
 "Our Last Time" (John Hanes, Jim Pugh) – 5:10

Personnel
Robert Cray - vocals and guitar
Tim Kaihatsu - guitar
Karl Sevareid - bass
Jim Pugh - keyboards
Kevin Hayes - drums
Memphis Horns
Andrew Love - tenor saxophone
Wayne Jackson - trumpet, trombone

References

External links 
 Review by Robert Christgau for Playboy

Robert Cray albums
1992 albums
Mercury Records albums